Lookahead or Look Ahead may refer to:

 A parameter of some combinatorial search algorithms, describing how deeply the graph representing the problem is explored
 A parameter of some parsing algorithms; the maximum number of tokens that a parser can use to decide which rule to use
 In dynamic range compression, a signal processing design to avoid compromise between slow attack rates that produce smooth-sounding gain changes, and fast attack rates capable of catching transients
 Look-ahead (backtracking), a subprocedure that attempts to predict the effects of choosing a branching variable to evaluate or one of its values
 Lookahead carry unit, a logical unit in digital circuit design used to decrease calculation time in adder units
 Look Ahead, a charitable housing association in London
 In regular expressions, an assertion to match characters after the current position

Education
Look Ahead, 1990s English as a foreign language multimedia classroom project by BBC English and other organisations

Music
Look Ahead (Pat Boone album), 1968
Look Ahead, 1992 album by Gerald Veasley
Look Ahead, 1995 album by Danny Tenaglia
"Look Ahead", 1992 song by Pat Metheny on the album Secret Story
"Look Ahead", 2014 song by rapper Future, on the album Honest (Future album)

See also 
 Looking Ahead (disambiguation)